Depository Trust Company (DTC), founded in 1973, is a New York corporation that performs the functions of a central securities depository as part of the US National Market System.  DTC annually settles transactions worth hundreds of trillions of dollars, processes hundreds of millions of book-entry deliveries, and custodies millions of securities issues worth tens of trillions of dollars issued in the United States and over 100  other countries.  Since 1999 it has been a subsidiary of the  Depository Trust & Clearing Corporation, a securities holding company.

History
DTC was formed in 1973 under the special incorporation laws of New York for trust companies. DTC manages book-entry securities entitlement transfers for brokerage houses and maintains custody of global (jumbo) stock certificates and other stock certificates through its affiliated partnership nominee, Cede and Company. DTC maintains Omnibus Customer Securities Accounts for the account of the DTC Participant.

Bill Dentzer was Chairman and CEO from 1973 to 1994. He was succeeded by William F. Jaenike, who was Chairman and CEO from 1994 to 1999.

Functions

DTC participants own the non-voting stock of DTC. Depository Trust & Clearing Corporation owns all of the voting stock in DTC, which makes DTC a subsidiary of Depository Trust & Clearing Corporation.

DTC is not the holder of record of the securities for which it manages the custody. Instead, DTC designates Cede and Company as their main custodial nominee pursuant to New York's Uniform Commercial Code, Article 8: Investment Securities. Cede and Company's partners are employees of DTC.

In 2007, DTC settled transactions worth $513 trillion, and processed 325 million book-entry deliveries.  In addition to settlement services, DTC retains custody of 3.5 million securities issues, worth about $40 trillion, including securities issued in the United States and more than 110 other countries.

DTC Eligibility

Stocks held by DTC are kept in the name of its partnership nominee, Cede and Company.  Not all securities are eligible to be settled through DTC ("DTC eligible").

DTC eligibility means that a company's stock is eligible for deposit with DTC aka "Cede and Company." A company's security holders will be able to deposit their particular shares with a brokerage firm. Clearing firms, as full participants with DTC, handle the DTC eligibility submissions to DTC. Transfer agents were responsible for eligibility coordination years ago. Now, in order to make a new issue of securities eligible for DTC's delivery services, a completed and signed eligibility questionnaire must be submitted to DTC's Underwriting Department, Eligibility. Parties that may submit the questionnaire include one of the following: Lead Manager/Underwriter, Issuer's financial advisor or the DTC Participant clearing the transaction for its correspondent. The Lead Manager/ Underwriter must ensure that DTC's Underwriting Department receives the issue's offering document (e.g., prospectus, offering memorandum, official statement) and the CUSIP numbers assigned to the issue within the time frames outlined in DTC's Operational Arrangements.

FAST processing is functionality that can be turned on for issuers who are fully DTC eligible. Participation in FAST (Fast Automated Securities Transfer) allows issuers, security holders and brokerage / clearing firms to move stock electronically between one another. Transfer agents, as limited participants, file for FAST participation. DTC approves each issuer on a merit review basis into this system.

"Chills and freezes"

Occasionally a problem may arise with a company or its securities on deposit at DTC. In some of those cases DTC may impose a "chill" or a "freeze" on all the company's securities. A "chill" is a restriction placed by DTC on one or more of DTC's services, such as limiting a DTC participant's ability to make a deposit or withdrawal of the security at DTC. A chill may remain imposed on a security for just a few days or for an extended period of time depending upon the reasons for the chill and whether the issuer or transfer agent corrects the problem. A "freeze" is a discontinuation of all services at DTC. Freezes may last a few days or an extended period of time, depending on the reason for the freeze. If the reasons for the freeze cannot be rectified, then the security will generally be removed from DTC, and securities transactions in that security will no longer be eligible to be cleared at any registered clearing agency. Chills and freezes are monitored by DTC's Office of Regulatory Compliance.

DTC imposes chills and freezes on securities for various reasons. For example, DTC may impose a chill on a security because the issuer no longer has a transfer agent to facilitate the transfer of the security or the transfer agent is not complying with DTC rules in its interactions with DTC in transferring the security. Often this type of situation is resolved within a short period of time.

Chills and freezes can be imposed on securities for more complicated reasons, such as when DTC determines that there may be a legal, regulatory, or operational problem with the issuance of the security, or the trading or clearing of transactions involving the security. For example, DTC may chill or freeze a security when DTC becomes aware or is informed by the issuer, transfer agent, federal or state regulators, or federal or state law enforcement officials that an issuance of some or all of the issuer's securities or transfer in those securities is in violation of state or federal law. If DTC suspects that all or a portion of its holdings of a security may not be freely transferable as is required for DTC services, it may decide to chill one or more of its services or place a freeze on all services for the security. When there is a corporate action, DTC will temporarily chill the security for book-entry activities. In other instances, a corporate action can cause a more permanent chill. This may force the issuer to reapply for eligibility altogether.

When DTC chills or freezes a security, it will issue a "Participant Notice" to its participants. These notices are publicly available on DTC's website.  When securities are frozen, DTC also provides optional automated notifications to its participants. These processes provide participants the ability to update their systems to automatically block future trading of affected securities, in addition to alerting participant compliance departments. DTC has information regarding these processes on its website.

See also
National Securities Clearing Corporation
Fixed Income Clearing Corporation

References

Financial services companies of the United States
Central securities depositories
Securities clearing and depository institutions
Financial services companies based in New York City
American companies established in 1973
Financial services companies established in 1973
1973 establishments in New York (state)
1973 establishments in the United States